Musa nagensium is a species of the genus Musa, found in tropical Asia.

References

nagensium
Flora of South-Central China
Flora of Assam (region)
Flora of East Himalaya
Flora of Myanmar
Flora of Thailand